Yore may refer to

Yöre, Kuyucak, a village in Turkey
Yore!, a comic strip in The Dandy
River Yore, a historic name of the River Ure in Yorkshire, England

See also
 
 You're
 Ore
 Yora (disambiguation)